Boats, Beaches, Bars & Ballads is a four-compact disc (or cassette) compilation box set of Jimmy Buffett and the Coral Reefer Band's greatest hits, rarities, and previously unreleased songs. Released in 1992, the collection reached quadruple platinum.

Track listing

Disc one: Boats
Boats is the boat and sailing-themed disc. "Love and Luck" was previously unreleased on a Buffett album. "Take It Back," written for the US America's Cup yachting team, was previously available only as a single release. "Love and Luck" would later appear on the live album, Tuesdays, Thursdays, and Saturdays.

Disc two: Beaches
Beaches is the beach and ocean-themed disc. Of the 18 beach songs, notable songs are "Margaritaville," also known as the Buffett national anthem, and "Cheeseburger in Paradise". "Money Back Guarantee" was previously unreleased on a Buffett album. "Christmas in the Caribbean" was previously released on the 1985 country music Christmas compilation album Tennessee Christmas.

Disc three: Bars
Bars is the drinking and party songs-themed disc. Beginning with "Fins", the album also includes "Why Don't We Get Drunk (And Screw)?" and "Pencil Thin Mustache." "Elvis Imitators," an attempt at an Elvis Presley rockabilly song, written by Steve Goodman and Mike Smith, and "Domino College" were both previously unreleased on a Buffett album. "Fins" and "Cuban Crime of Passion" were co-written with novelist Tom Corcoran.

Disc four: Ballads
Ballads is the ballads and love song-themed disc. The most notable songs are "Come Monday" and "He Went to Paris". This collection includes a remix of "I Heard I Was in Town", not the version that appears on Somewhere over China. "Middle of the Night" was previously unreleased on a Buffett album. "Everlasting Moon", was a live recording from Buffett's 1990 live album, Feeding Frenzy.

Album information
Not counting eight unreleased songs, the box set focuses primarily on Buffett's 1970s and 1980s output. Buffett recorded and released 35 of the tracks in the 1970s and 26 of the tracks in the 1980s. The box set takes songs from every studio album Buffett released up to that point, barring only Down to Earth (1970), Rancho Deluxe (1975), and High Cumberland Jubilee (1976).

"Take It Back", "Love and Luck", "Money Back Guarantee", "Christmas in the Caribbean", "Elvis Imitators", "Domino College", "Everlasting Moon", and "Middle of the Night" were previously unreleased on a Buffett album.

Seven songs appear from the 1973 album, A White Sport Coat and a Pink Crustacean
"Grapefruit—Juicy Fruit"
"I Have Found Me a Home"
"Cuban Crime of Passion"
"The Great Filling Station Holdup"
"Why Don't We Get Drunk (And Screw)?"
"They Don't Dance Like Carmen No More"
"He Went to Paris"

Four songs appear from Buffett's 1974 album, Living and Dying in 3/4 Time
"The Wino and I Know"
"Pencil Thin Mustache"
"Come Monday"
"Ballad of Spider John"

Four songs appear from Buffett's 1974 album, A1A
"Nautical Wheelers"
"Trying to Reason with Hurricane Season"
"A Pirate Looks at Forty"
"Tin Cup Chalice"

Four songs appear from Buffett's 1976 album, Havana Daydreamin'
"Havana Daydreamin'"
"The Captain and the Kid"
"Kick It in Second Wind" 
"Defying Gravity"

Five songs appear from the 1977 album, Changes in Latitudes, Changes in Attitudes
"Changes in Latitudes, Changes in Attitudes"
"Lovely Cruise"
"Margaritaville"
"Biloxi"
"Tampico Trauma"

Six songs appear from the 1978 album, Son of a Son of a Sailor
"Son of a Son of a Sailor"
"Mañana"
"Cheeseburger in Paradise"
"Livingston Saturday Night"
"African Friend"
"Coast of Marseilles"

Six songs appear from the 1979 album, Volcano
"Treat Her Like a Lady"
"Boat Drinks"
"Volcano"
"Fins"
"Sending the Old Man Home"
"Survive"

Six songs appear from the 1981 album, Coconut Telegraph
"Coconut Telegraph"
"The Weather Is Here, Wish You Were Beautiful"
"Incommunicado"
"Little Miss Magic"
"Island"
"Stars Fell on Alabama"

Four songs appear from the 1982 album, Somewhere over China
"Steamer"
"On a Slow Boat to China"
"When Salome Plays The Drum"
"I Heard I Was in Town"

Six songs appear from the 1983 album, One Particular Harbour
"One Particular Harbour"
"Distantly in Love"
"Stars On The Water"
"Brown Eyed Girl"
"California Promises"
"Twelve Volt Man"

Three songs appear from the 1984 album, Riddles in the Sand
"Ragtop Day"
"Knees of My Heart"
"Who's the Blonde Stranger?"

Four songs appear from the 1985 album, Last Mango In Paris
"Jolly Mon Sing"
"Frank and Lola"
"Desperation Samba (Halloween in Tijuana)"
"If The Phone Doesn't Ring, It's Me"

Two songs appear from the 1986 album, Floridays
"When the Coast Is Clear"
"First Look"

One song appears from the 1988 album, Hot Water
"Pre-You"

Two songs appear from the 1989 album, Off to See the Lizard
"The Pascagoula Run"
"Changing Channels"

Charts and certifications

Weekly charts

References

1992 compilation albums
MCA Records compilation albums
Jimmy Buffett compilation albums
Country music compilation albums
Pop compilation albums